Lebohang Kukame (born 4 June 1978) is a South African former professional soccer player who played as a centre forward. He was capped 7 times by South Africa and scored once. He previously represented South Africa at under-23 level and was a standby player for their 2000 Summer Olympics squad.

References

1978 births
Living people
South African soccer players
Sportspeople from Germiston
Association football forwards
Bloemfontein Celtic F.C. players
Jomo Cosmos F.C. players
SuperSport United F.C. players
Manning Rangers F.C. players
Santos F.C. (South Africa) players
Maritzburg United F.C. players
Roses United F.C. players
South African Premier Division players
South Africa international soccer players
South Africa youth international soccer players